A.S. Cooper Farm is a historic farm complex and  national historic district located near Brownwood, Ashe County, North Carolina.  The district encompasses 13 contributing buildings, 2 contributing sites, and 1 contributing structure.  They are located in three primary clusters on the farm.  The  A.S. Cooper, Sr. cluster includes the A.S. Cooper, Sr. House (c. 1890), spring house (c. 1890), tool shed / wood shed (c. 1890, c. 1925), chicken coop (c. 1939), granary (c. 1890), and garage (1934).  The second cluster is the barn / milking parlor (1908, 1946, c. 1980), and silo (c. 1947) complex.  The third cluster includes the Albert Sidney Cooper, Jr. House (1918), small shed (c. 1918), kitchen building, shed (c. 1940), spring house (c. 1880), and barn. Associated with the complex is the family cemetery and agricultural landscape.

It was listed on the National Register of Historic Places in 2001.

References

Historic districts on the National Register of Historic Places in North Carolina
Farms on the National Register of Historic Places in North Carolina
Houses completed in 1890
Houses in Ashe County, North Carolina
National Register of Historic Places in Ashe County, North Carolina